Eduardo Quesada (born 11 October 1963) is a Spanish modern pentathlete. He competed at the 1988 Summer Olympics.

References

1963 births
Living people
Spanish male modern pentathletes
Olympic modern pentathletes of Spain
Modern pentathletes at the 1988 Summer Olympics